Hexinlusaurus is a genus of basal ornithischian dinosaur from the Middle Jurassic of China. The holotype (ZDM T6001, Zigong Dinosaur Museum, Dashanpu, People's Republic of China), consists of an almost complete, articulated skull and some postcranial material, collected from a terrestrial sandstone within the Lower Shaximiao Formation (?Bajocian) at the famous dinosaur-bearing quarries at Dashanpu. A paratype (ZDM T6002) consists of a partial skull and postcranial remains. Previously, it had been described as a species of Yandusaurus, Y. multidens (He and Cai, 1983), but was reclassified as a new taxon by Paul M. Barrett, Richard J. Butler and Fabien Knoll in 2005, who diagnosed this anatomically conservative species as follows: "A small ornithischian dinosaur distinguished from all other basal ornithischians by a single autapomorphy, the presence of a marked concavity that extends over the lateral surface of the postorbital." The etymology of the genus name honors Professor He Xin-Lu   (from the Chengdu University of Technology) who originally named the specimen as Y. multidens + the Greek sauros (=lizard). Hexinlusaurus was a small, fleet-footed herbivore.

Other dinosaurs known from Dashanpu include the sauropod Shunosaurus, the  theropod Gasosaurus, and the stegosaur Huayangosaurus.

Before being officially named Hexinlusaurus, this genus was briefly known under the informal name "Proyandusaurus".  This name originally appeared in an abstract attributed to Fabien Knoll, which was apparently published in 1999 without his consent.

Sources

Knoll, F. 1999. The family Fabrosauridae. In: J. I. Canudo and G. Cuenca-Bescós (Eds.): IV European Workshop on Vertebrate Palaeontology, Albarracin (Teruel, Spain), junio de 1999. Programme and Abstracts, Field guide. Servicio Publicaciones Universidad de Zaragoza, 54.

Middle Jurassic dinosaurs of Asia
Ornithischian genera
Jurassic China
Paleontology in Sichuan
Fossil taxa described in 2005